Harold Dadford West (July 16, 1904 – March 5, 1974) was an American biochemist who was the first to synthesize threonine.

References

See also
 threonine

American biochemists
1904 births
1974 deaths
People from Flemington, New Jersey